Ember is coach operator in Scotland. It operates the first electric intercity coach services in the United Kingdom.

History 
Ember was founded in 2019 by Pierce Glennie and Keith Bradbury, who previously worked for iwoca. Glennie was inspired by a bus journey he took from Namibia to South Africa. The name Ember was chosen because it describes "the end of fire".

Ember's first route, between Dundee and Edinburgh, was planned to start operating in March 2020, but this was set back by the COVID-19 pandemic delaying the delivery of its first coach. Ember received a £490,000 Coronavirus Business Interruption loan via Triodos Bank, which allowed it to launch in October 2020 with two coaches. The coaches recharge at a Dundee City Council charging point at Greenmarket.

In February 2022, Ember was awarded £5,562,126 from the Scottish Zero Emission Bus challenge fund for 26 battery electric vehicles and associated charging infrastructure. Ember aims to develop a national network running between all the main cities in Scotland. It launched a route between Dundee and Glasgow in August 2022.

Routes

E1 

 Dundee Science Centre
 Dundee Technology Park
 Longforgan
 Inchture
 St Madoes
 Bridge of Earn
 Kinross park and ride 
 Rosyth
 Ingliston Park and Ride  
 Edinburgh Zoo
 Haymarket railway station  
 St Andrew Square

E3 

 Dundee Malmaison
 Dundee Technology Park
 Longforgan
 Inchture
 St Madoes
 Broxden Junction park and ride 
 Auchterarder Gleneagles railway station 
 Greenloaning
 Dunblane
 Stirling
 Cumbernauld
 Buchanan bus station

Tickets and fares 

Tickets can be bought in advance on Ember's website up to 10 minutes before the scheduled departure time, but are also sold onboard at most stops. Passengers with a Scottish National Entitlement Card travel for free. Through tickets are available to Edinburgh Airport, which includes a short tram journey.

Fleet 

Ember's first two Yutong TCe12 battery electric coaches were delivered in 2020. A further two were added in 2021, and four more in 2022, funded by the Scottish Utra-Low Emission Bus Scheme. Ember was also awarded funding for four single-deck Arrival buses.

References 

Bus operators in Scotland